Astronauts is a 2003 Spanish film written and directed by Santi Amodeo which stars Nancho Novo and Teresa Hurtado de Ory. It could be classified as a bittersweet comedy.

Plot 
The plot tracks the (im)possible relationship between Daniel (a misanthrope and recovering heroin abuser) and Laura (a teenager without a family who, initially bemused, ends up trying to fix Daniel's life).

Cast

Production 
Astronauts is the solo debut feature of Santi Amodeo, who had previously co-helmed The Pilgrim Factor in tandem with Alberto Rodríguez. A Tesela PC and La Zanfoña production, it had the collaboration of Canal Sur and Canal+. In addition to Seville, shooting locations also included Los Alcornocales and the port of San Fernando. The film boasted a budget of around €1.6 million.

Release 
The film was presented at the 48th Valladolid International Film Festival (Seminci) in October 2003. Distributed by Alta Classics, the film was theatrically released in Spain on 5 March 2004.

Reception 
Casimiro Torreiro of El País deemed Astronauts to be "a film to be loved", "a rara avis of those that, with its flaws and imperfections, we wish we could watch more often".

Jonathan Holland of Variety deemed the film to be an "unpolished gem whose freshness and originality far outweigh its occasional indulgences".

Accolades 

|-
| rowspan = "2" align = "center" | 2005 || rowspan = "2" | 19th Goya Awards || Best New Director || Santi Amodeo ||  || rowspan = "2" | 
|-
| Best New Actress || Teresa Hurtado de Ory || 
|}

See also 
 List of Spanish films of 2004

References 

2003 comedy-drama films
Spanish comedy-drama films
Films shot in the province of Seville
Films shot in the province of Cádiz
2000s Spanish films
2000s Spanish-language films